Duthiea is a genus of Asian plants in the grass family.

 Species
 Duthiea brachypodium (P.Candargy) Keng & Keng f. - Qinghai, Sichuan, Tibet, Yunnan, Bhutan, Nepal, Sikkim, Arunachal Pradesh
 Duthiea bromoides Hack. - Jammu & Kashmir, Federally Administered Tribal Areas of Pakistan, Afghanistan
 Duthiea oligostachya (Munro ex Aitch.) Stapf - Kurram Valley in Pakistan + Afghanistan

 names in homonymic genus in Hyacinthaceae
see Drimia 
 Duthiea macrocarpa - Drimia macrocarpa 
 Duthiea noctiflora - Drimia noctiflora  
 Duthiea senegalensis - Drimia senegalensis

References

Pooideae
Poaceae genera
Taxa named by Eduard Hackel